Krzysztof Buczkowski (born 30 April 1986 in Grudziądz, Poland) is a motorcycle speedway rider from Poland.

Career
Buczkowski has ridden for the Polish national junior team.

He started speedway in 2002 with GKM Grudziądz and rode for them until the end of 2004. In 2005, he joined Polonia Bydgoszcz until the end of 2009, when he returned to Grudziądz. After a third stint with the club from 2013 to 2020, he joined KM Cross Lublin and then Falubaz Zielona Góra.

Results

Speedway Grand Prix

World Under-21 Championship
2007 - 17th place in Semi-Final B (injury)

Team Under-21 World Cup
2006 - World Champion (5 points)
2007 - World Champion (11 points)

Other
European Under-19 Championship=
2004 - 9th place
2005 - 6th place

Polish Individual Championship
2004 - 11 place in Quarter-Final B
2005 - 9 place in Quarter-Final B
2006 - 17th place (O heat as track reserve)
2007 - injury in Quarter-Final A

Polish Under-21 Individual Championship
2004 - 7-8th place in Semi-Final A
2005 - 11th place (6 points)
2006 - 5th place (11 points)
2007 - injury in Semi-Final B

Polish Pairs Championship
2003 - 7th place in Semi-Final B
2004 - 4th place (1 point)

Polish Under-21 Pairs Championship
2004 - 3rd place in Semi-Final C
2005 - 6th place (6 points)
2006 - Silver medal (14 points)

Polish Team Championship
2002 - 8th place in First League with GKM Grudziądz
2003 - 1st place in Second League with GTŻ Primus Grudziądz
2005 - 5 place in First League with Kunter GTŻ Grudziądz (and 1st place in First-Second League Race-Off)
2005 - Silver medal with Budlex-Polonia Bydgoszcz
2006 - Bronze medal Budlex-Polonia Bydgoszcz
2007 - with Polonia Bydgoszcz (last round October 7)

Polish Under-21 Team Championship
2002 - 3rd in Qualification Group B
2003 - 4th place (5 points)
2004 - 3rd in Qualification Group C
2005 - 4th place (7 points)
2006 - 2nd in Qualification Group C
2007 - Last round in Qualification Group A will be on September 15

Golden Helmet
2006 - 12th place (5 points)

Silver Helmet (U-21)
2003 - 6th place (8 points)
2004 - 9th place (6 points)
2005 - 9th place (7 points)
2006 - 4th place (10 points)

Bronze Helmet (U-19)''
2003 - 5th place (10 points)
2004 - Bronze medal''' (13+F/X points)
2005 - 8th place (7 points)

See also
 Poland national speedway team
 List of Speedway Grand Prix riders

References

External links

1986 births
Living people
Polish speedway riders
People from Grudziądz
Team Speedway Junior World Champions
Polonia Bydgoszcz riders
Poole Pirates riders
Reading Racers riders